Posterior iliac spine may refer to:

 Posterior superior iliac spine
 Posterior inferior iliac spine